"Your Love" is a song by the husband/wife duo of Marilyn McCoo and Billy Davis Jr., former members of the vocal group The 5th Dimension.  Released from their album, I Hope We Get to Love in Time, it was the follow-up to their number-one hit, "You Don't Have to Be a Star (To Be in My Show)".

Chart performance
The song reached number 15 on the Billboard Hot 100 during the spring of 1977. It reached number 21 on the US Easy Listening chart. Also, it was a top 10 hit on the US R&B singles chart, where it peaked at number nine.

In Canada, "Your Love" peaked at number 13 on the pop chart and number 17 on the AC chart.  Unlike its predecessor, however, the song did not chart outside North America.

Weekly charts

Year-end charts

References

External links
 

1977 singles
Male–female vocal duets
1976 songs
ABC Records singles
Marilyn McCoo songs
Songs written by H. B. Barnum
Song recordings produced by Don Davis (record producer)